The large-eared gray shrew (Notiosorex evotis) is a species of shrew.

References

External links  
 ITES

Notiosorex
Mammals described in 1877